Oracene Price (born April 3, 1952) is an American tennis coach. She is best known for being both the mother and coach of Venus and Serena Williams, who are both widely regarded among the best tennis players of all time. She is the former wife of Richard Williams, whom she divorced in 2002.

Biography 
Nicknamed "Brandy", Price was born in Saginaw, Michigan in 1952. Her father was an automotive worker from the Mississippi Delta. She graduated from Buena Vista High School in 1970 and from Western Michigan University. She has three daughters from a previous marriage to Yusef Rasheed: Yetunde Price (1972–2003), who was a former beauty salon owner and registered nurse; Lyndrea Price, a Web designer; and Isha Price, a lawyer. After Rasheed's death, while working as a nurse, Oracene married Richard Williams and had two more daughters, Venus Williams and Serena Williams. Both Venus and Serena are high-ranked professional tennis players who have won numerous Grand Slam tournaments. She helped her husband as he began coaching Venus and Serena in tennis. The Williams family moved to Florida on the offer of Rick Macci to coach their daughters for free.

By the end of 2000, Price was no longer living with her husband Richard Williams, and citing irreconcilable differences, they divorced in 2002. She reverted to her maiden name of Price.

During a semifinal match between Serena  and Justine Henin at the 2003 French Open, Williams was booed by fans after a complaint about a line call. Price believes that the boos were motivated by race, saying "We, as black people, live with this all the time. It's all about control." Tennis journalist and author L. Jon Wertheim has said of Price, "You have to respect anyone incapable of gloss or spin (i.e., unwilling to lie)."

Price describes herself as a deeply spiritual woman. Price also has described herself as being a "rampant feminist" when dealing with the overly sexualized images of women in the media.

She traveled to Kenya with her daughter Serena for charity work, as well as Senegal to aid in the construction of schools.

Price was portrayed by Aunjanue Ellis in the 2021 biopic King Richard. Ellis was nominated for the Academy Award for Best Supporting Actress for her performance while the film itself was nominated for the Academy Award for Best Picture.

Coaching 
Price's coaching has arguably been overshadowed by her role as mother, but as a coach she has been called underappreciated. Price is not a coach in a traditional sense (though she did learn tennis herself to help teach her daughters the technical aspects of the game) and is instead credited, along with Richard  for helping to build a solid foundation of self-esteem and outside interests for her daughters.

Venus and Serena's "poise under pressure" is often credited to the self-belief instilled in them by their mother. "There's no such thing as pressure," says Price. "As black Americans, that's all we've ever had. It's life. So where's the pressure?" This approach was coupled with, according to noted tennis coach Nick Bollettieri, a respect that meant that neither Price nor Richard Williams raised their voices to their daughters. Journalist Bonnie D. Ford has said that the longevity exhibited by the Williams sisters is directly attributable to their parents and the way that Richard Williams and Price have helped them manage their careers and lives. Ford believes it is especially admirable that Price and her former husband have continued to remain jointly supportive despite their separation.

References

Further reading 
Bradley, Michael (2003). Venus Williams. Michael Cavendish Publishing. .

1952 births
Living people
Sportspeople from Saginaw, Michigan
American tennis coaches
Western Michigan University alumni
Williams family (tennis)